39382 Opportunity, also designated , is a dark Hilidan asteroid from the outermost region of the asteroid belt, approximately 7.5 kilometers in diameter. Discovered during the Palomar–Leiden survey at Palomar Observatory in 1960, it was named for NASA's Opportunity Mars rover.

Discovery 

Opportunity was discovered on 24 September 1960, by Dutch astronomer couple Ingrid and Cornelis van Houten, as well as Dutch–American astronomer Tom Gehrels from photographic plates taken at the Palomar Observatory, California, United States.

Survey designation 

The survey designation "P-L" stands for "Palomar–Leiden", named after Palomar Observatory and Leiden Observatory, which collaborated on the fruitful Palomar–Leiden survey in the 1960s. Gehrels used Palomar's Samuel Oschin telescope (also known as the 48-inch Schmidt Telescope), and shipped the photographic plates to Ingrid and Cornelis van Houten at Leiden Observatory where astrometry was carried out. The trio are credited with the discovery of several thousand minor planets.

Orbit and classification 

Located in the outermost part of the main-belt, Opportunity is a member of the Hilda family, a large group of asteroids that are thought to have originated from the Kuiper belt. They orbit in a 3:2 orbital resonance with the gas giant Jupiter, meaning that for every 2 orbits Jupiter completes around the Sun, a Hildian asteroid will complete 3 orbits.

Opportunity orbits the Sun at a distance of 3.2–4.8 AU once every 7 years and 11 months (2,880 days). Its orbit has an eccentricity of 0.20 and an inclination of 3° with respect to the ecliptic. The asteroid's orbit does not cross the path of any of the planets and therefore it will not be pulled out of orbit by Jupiter's gravitational field. As a result of this, it is likely that the asteroid will remain in a stable orbit for thousands of years.

The body's observation arc begins with its official discovery observation, as no precoveries were taken and no prior identifications were made.

Physical characteristics

Diameter and albedo 

According to the survey carried out by NASA's Wide-field Infrared Survey Explorer with its subsequent NEOWISE mission, Opportunity measures 7.45 kilometers in diameter and its surface has an albedo of 0.061, which is typical for carbonaceous asteroids. A generic magnitude-to-diameter conversion, gives a diameter of 7 kilometers, for an absolute magnitude of 14.5 and an assumed albedo of 0.05.

Lightcurves 

As of 2017, the asteroid's composition, shape and rotation period remain unknown.

Naming 

This minor planet was named after a Mars Exploration Rover, Opportunity, following a proposal by the discoverer Ingrid van Houten-Groeneveld. The approved naming citation was published by the Minor Planet Center on 28 September 2004. The minor planet 37452 Spirit was named for Opportunitys twin rover, Spirit.

References

External links 
 Asteroid Lightcurve Database (LCDB), query form (info )
 Dictionary of Minor Planet Names, Google books
 Asteroids and comets rotation curves, CdR – Observatoire de Genève, Raoul Behrend
 Discovery Circumstances: Numbered Minor Planets (1)-(5000) – Minor Planet Center
 
 

039382
Discoveries by Cornelis Johannes van Houten
Discoveries by Ingrid van Houten-Groeneveld
Discoveries by Tom Gehrels
2696
Named minor planets
19600924